A Wonderful Life is the eighth studio album by heavy metal band Mushroomhead. It was released on June 19, 2020 and is their first album to feature Steve Rauckhorst on vocals. It is also the first Mushroomhead album without vocalist Jeffrey Hatrix and keyboardist Tom Schmitz and the only full album with Jackie LaPonza on vocals and Tom Shaffner on guitar.

To promote A Wonderful Life, Mushroomhead released "Seen It All" as a single on April 21, 2020.

Background and history
In September 2016, Mushroomhead announced that the band would return to the studio in the fall of 2016 to record their eighth studio album. In March 2018, it was announced long-time vocalist Jeffrey Nothing had departed the band, with guitarist Tommy Church announcing his departure a few days later. Later that month, it was announced that Steve Rauckhorst would be the new vocalist, and Tom Shaffner as the new guitarist respectfully.

On April 4, 2019, Mushroomhead announced that they had signed with Napalm Records. Steve Felton and Jackie LaPonza revealed that during the tour they had recorded vocals at Abbey Road Studios while on a UK tour in July 2019, and that the new album was 80% finished.

On April 21, 2020, The album's first single "Seen It All" was also released. Later that day, A Wonderful Life was announced as the title of the band's new album, and would be released on June 19, 2020. It was also announced touring vocalist Jackie LaPonza had officially joined the band.

On May 26, 2020, the band released the second single, "The Heresy".

Track listing

Bonus tracks

Personnel

Mushroomhead
 Jason Popson - harsh vocals (tracks 1-5, 7-11, 15, 16); rapped vocals (tracks 2, 7, 8, 15)
 Steve Rauckhorst - clean and harsh vocals (tracks 1-3, 5-12, 15, 16)
 Jackie LaPonza - clean vocals (tracks 2, 4, 6, 7, 12)
 Tom Shaffner - guitars
 Rick Thomas - keyboards, synthesizers, samples, electronics
 Ryan Farrell -  bass guitar, keyboards, piano
 Steve Felton - drums
 Robbie Godsey - drums, additional percussion

Other personnel
Cleveland Chamber Choir - additional choir vocals (tracks 1, 6, 13 and 17)

Production staff
 Steve Felton - production, engineering
 Matt Wallace - mixing, additional production
 Ryan Farrell - additional engineering
 Don DeBiase - additional engineering
 Bill Korecky - additional production on Carry On
 Craig Martini - additional production on Carry On
 Howie Weinberg - mastering
 Gus Fink - cover art

References

Mushroomhead albums
2020 albums
Doom metal albums by American artists